Cochlin is a protein that in humans is encoded by the COCH gene. It is an extracellular matrix (ECM) protein highly abundant in the cochlea and vestibule of the inner ear, constituting the major non-collagen component of the ECM of the inner ear. The protein is highly conserved in human, mouse, and chicken, showing 94% and 79% amino acid identity of human to mouse and chicken sequences, respectively.

Structure 
Cochlin contains three protein domains: an N-terminal LCCL domain, and two copies of Von Willebrand factor type A domains.

Function 
The gene is expressed in spindle-shaped cells located along nerve fibers between the auditory ganglion and sensory epithelium. These cells accompany neurites at the habenula perforata, the opening through which neurites extend to innervate hair cells. This and the pattern of expression of this gene in chicken inner ear paralleled the histologic findings of acidophilic deposits, consistent with mucopolysaccharide ground substance, in temporal bones from DFNA9 (autosomal dominant nonsyndromic sensorineural deafness 9) patients. Mutations that cause DFNA9 have been reported in this gene.

Cochlin has been identified in the trabecular meshwork (TM) of glaucoma patients, but not in healthy controls. The TM is a filter like area of tissue in the eye; cochlin may have a role in cell adhesion, mechanosensation, and modulation of the TM filter.

It is also expressed in follicular dendritic cells in spleen and lymph nodes. Here, cochlin is cleaved by aggrecanases and secreted into blood circulation during inflammation, contributing to the antibacterial innate immune response.

References

Further reading 

 
 
 
 

 
 
 
 
 
 
 
 
 
 
 

Extracellular matrix proteins